Lebanon Township may refer to:

Illinois
 Lebanon Township, St. Clair County, Illinois

Michigan
 Lebanon Township, Michigan

Minnesota
 Lebanon Township, Minnesota, now the city of Apple Valley

Missouri
 Lebanon Township, Cooper County, Missouri
 Lebanon Township, Laclede County, Missouri

New Jersey
 Lebanon Township, New Jersey

North Carolina
 Lebanon Township, Durham County, North Carolina

North Dakota
 Lebanon Township, McHenry County, North Dakota, in McHenry County, North Dakota

Ohio
 Lebanon Township, Meigs County, Ohio

Pennsylvania
 Lebanon Township, Pennsylvania
 North Lebanon Township, Pennsylvania
 South Lebanon Township, Pennsylvania
 West Lebanon Township, Pennsylvania
 Mount Lebanon Township, Pennsylvania

Township name disambiguation pages